Joseph Perotaux (8 January 1883 – 23 April 1967) was a French fencer. He won a gold medal in the foil competition at the 1924 Summer Olympics.

References

External links
 

1883 births
1967 deaths
French male foil fencers
Olympic fencers of France
Fencers at the 1924 Summer Olympics
Olympic gold medalists for France
Olympic medalists in fencing
Sportspeople from Nantes
Medalists at the 1924 Summer Olympics